Maria Spacagna is an American soprano; she is known for being the first American-born opera singer to play the title role in Madame Butterfly at La Scala in Milan, Italy where the opera premiered. Born in Providence, Rhode Island, Spacagna trained at the New England Conservatory of Music in Boston, Massachusetts, where she earned both her bachelor's and master's degrees. Spacagna had her Metropolitan Opera House debut as Luisa Miller in Luisa Miller opposite Luciano Pavarotti in 1991, and performed in 13 productions there. She played the title role in Madame Butterfly on the 1995 Vox Records recording, the first-ever full recording of the opera. In 1997, Spacagna won the top prize at the Verdi Competition in Bussetto, Italy.  She was inducted to the Rhode Island Heritage Hall of Fame that year. 

Spacagna went on to teach, and she is now a professor of voice at Carnegie Mellon.

References 

Singers from Rhode Island
20th-century American women opera  singers
21st-century American women  opera singers
Musicians from Providence, Rhode Island
New England Conservatory alumni
Carnegie Mellon University faculty
American operatic sopranos
Classical musicians from Rhode Island
Year of birth missing (living people)
Living people